The 2003–04 Temple Owls men's basketball team represented Temple University in the 2003–04 NCAA Division I men's basketball season. They were led by head coach John Chaney and played their home games at the Liacouras Center. The Owls are members of the Atlantic 10 Conference. They finished the season 15–14, 9–7 in A-10 play, and reached the 2004 National Invitation Tournament.

Roster

References

2014-15 Temple Owls Men's Basketball Media Guide

Temple
Temple Owls men's basketball seasons
Temple
Temple
Temple